The Ponton Heath Barrow Cemetery is a group of at least eleven Middle Bronze Age round barrows south of Grantham, in the South Kesteven district of Lincolnshire, England. Five of the barrows were destroyed by ironstone quarrying in 1959; the remaining six are scheduled monuments. The sites have been placed on the Heritage at Risk Register.

Location
The cemetery is located on Ponton Heath, an area of high ground several miles south of the market town of Grantham. The centre of the area is occupied by the backfilled remains of an ironstone quarry which was active from the 1950s to the 1970s; this activity was responsible for the destruction of five barrows in 1959. Of the surviving monuments, Barrow A is located to the north of the former works, on the parish boundary between Wyville cum Hungerton and Little Ponton and Stroxton. The remaining five, Barrows B, C, F, G and H, are located on the south side of the site. 

A low mound, possibly a 12th barrow, is located between and slightly to the north of Barrows C and F.

Description
The surviving barrows are all located on arable farmland which is ploughed and under crop. Due to the danger of them being ploughed out, the sites have been placed on the Heritage at Risk Register.

Excavations and investigations
In 1959, following the opening of Harlaxton Quarry No. 4 (or Hungerton Quarry), a rescue excavation was carried out by Ernest Greenfield of the Ministry of Works. He arrived to find much of the topsoil already stripped from the site and several of the barrows pillaged. In Barrow J he found an intact main burial chamber containing a crushed red collared urn, decorated with cord impressions, inverted over burned bone. He also found numerous secondary cremations and stone tools, leading him to classify the builders as the "Yorkshire Food Vessel Culture" in the terminology of the time.

The site also contained evidence of later Romano-British occupation. Examination of topsoil removed from the destroyed portion of the site yielded fragments of Roman Samian and grey ware pottery. The urn from Barrow J was conveyed to the Lincoln Museum; other artifacts were deposited with the Grantham Museum.

Fieldwalking of the area west of Barrow A in the 1960s and 70s also turned up a large scatter of stone tools, and a child's bronze bracelet dated to the Roman era.

List of barrows

Notes

References

Archaeological sites in Lincolnshire
History of Lincolnshire
Scheduled monuments in Lincolnshire
Bronze Age sites in Lincolnshire
Buildings and structures in Lincolnshire